Acacia menzelii, commonly known as Tallebung wattle or Menzel's wattle, is a shrub belonging to the genus Acacia and the subgenus Plurinerves native to a small area of southern Australia.

Description
It has sparsely hairy branchlets that branch off near ground level forming a number of ascending stems . The flat, green, terete phyllodes have a linear shape and can be straight or incurved.

Taxonomy
The specific epithet honours O.E.Menzel, a botanist who collected the type specimen near Monarto in 1897.
The shrub is part of the Acacia wilhelmiana group along with nine close relatives: Acacia abrupta, Acacia ascendens, Acacia barattensis, Acacia brachypoda, Acacia cowaniana, Acacia helmsiana, Acacia leptalea, Acacia gracilifolia and Acacia viscifolia.

Distribution
The shrub is scattered in an area of South Australia in the Murray region around Monarto and in the Flinders Range is often situated in gorges or on rocky hillsides growing in brown to grey calcareous loamy soils as a part of scrubby Eucalyptus woodland communities.

See also
 List of Acacia species

References

menzelii
Flora of South Australia
Plants described in 1917
Taxa named by John McConnell Black